Nancy Mercado Ph.D. (Born December 1959) is an American writer, editor, educator and activist; her work focuses on issues of injustice, the environment, and the Puerto Rican and Latino experience in the United States. She forms part of the Nuyorican Movement, a literary genre which arose from the Beat Movement.

Life and education 

Mercado was born and raised in Atlantic City, New Jersey.  She received a B.A. from Rutgers, the State University of New Jersey in 1982, with a double major in art/art history and Puerto Rican Studies, and her M.A. from New York University in Liberal Studies with a concentration in script writing and Cinema Studies (1989). In 1989 she was accepted into the School of Drama at Yale University but had to leave toward the end of the first semester due to her financial situation. Her doctoral degree was awarded in 2004 in English literature, with a concentration in creative writing, from Binghamton University.

Career 
Mercado began her literary career in 1979; as such, some consider her to be part of the second wave of writers who constitute the Nuyorican literary movement. Of her work, Dr. Marilyn Kiss writes, "if the personal is political, then such verses as, "He was forgotten/before he could be remembered/by the heads of state/he provided sugar for," written about her grandfather, Don Portolo, "Director of the Sugar Cane Field Workers", and "Milla can speak of/The turn of the century land reforms,/Of the blinded enthusiasm/For a man called Marín..." about her grandmother, Milla, and "Juanita, Providing food from soil,/Creating homes from ashes,/Teaching tolerance by living..." about her aunt in Puerto Rico, offer testimony to the power of this type of poetic vision."

Mercado's book of poems; It Concerns the Madness (Long Shot Productions), was published in 2000. In 2005 she served on the editorial board for a special issue of Letras Femeninas; a publication of the Asociación Internacional De Literatura Femenina Hispánica, Department of Languages and Literature, Arizona State University. Latino Leaders Magazine's 2007 issue profiled her as "one of the most celebrated members of the Puerto Rican literary movement in the Big Apple."

In 2011 Mercado was guest editor of phati’tude Literary Magazine's winter issue ¿What's in a Nombre? Writing Latin@ Identity in America.

Mercado's film, video and radio features include the 1990s Poetry Spots video series directed by Bob Holman, the documentary film, Yari, Yari Pamberi Black Women Writers Dissenting Globalization directed by Jayne Cortez, the 2011 PBS NewsHour documentary special; America Remembers 9/11. and, National Public Radio's, The Talk of the Nation program; Subdued Reflection On Sept. 11 Anniversary in 2012.

Bibliography

Books 

Las Tres Hermanas... children's coloring book. New York City: Casita Maria, 2017
Nuyorican Writers Anthology. Editor. New York City: Centro, Hunter College City University of New York, 2015
It Concerns the Madness. Hoboken: Long Shot Productions, 2000. 
if the world were mine... the young writer's workshop anthology. Editor. Newark: New Jersey Performing Arts Center Publication and United Way of Essex and West Hudson, 2003.

One-act plays 

Palm Trees in the Snow (1989)
Chillin (1990)
Forever Earth (1991)
It is I; Stay Alive! (1992)
Planet Earth (1993)
Alicia in Projectland, coauthored with Pedro Pietri (1994)
AWAY (1996)

Essays 
"Ser o no ser Nuyorican." La Ventana. Havana, Cuba: Casa de las Americas, 2014.
"About Face: My Brief Journey as a Female Puerto Rican Poet." Gare Maritime. Nantes, France: Maison de la Poesie, 2000.
"AIDS in My World." Not in My Family: AIDS in the African American Community. Editor. Gil L. Robertson IV. Los Angeles, California: Agate Publishers, 2006. 
"Miguel Piñero." (Biographical entry.) The Encyclopedia of Hispanic-American Literature. Editor. Luz Elena Ramírez. New York: Facts on File, 2009.
"Youth Performance Workshops Reach Students in Elizabeth." Resource. Newark, NJ: New Jersey Performing Arts Center Publication, 1996.

See also

	
 List of Puerto Ricans	
 List of Puerto Rican writers
 Nuyorican Movement
 Nuyorican Poets Cafe
 Puerto Rican literature

Further reading 
 The Frederick Douglass 200, The Guardian Newspaper
 Alumna Wins American Book Award for Lifetime Achievement, Rutgers Today
 Nancy Mercado: The Passion of Nuyorican Poetry, Blues.GR
 Mercado Honored for Lifetime Literary Achievement, BingU News
 The Honor of a Lifetime, Rutgers Magazine
 Rutgers launched the career of this Puerto Rican poet. Now she's fighting for the Earth's future, BTN Big Ten Network
 Nuyorican Womens Anthology Part One
 Nuyorican Womens Anthology Part Two
 Cure the Canon of Literary Agoraphobia, New York Times
 The Balance of Understanding, Tribes Magazine
 Book Reviewing African-American Style, The Nation
 End of an era Long Shot to cease publishing, The Hudson Reporter
 First on the Listening List, Top of the Reading Stack for 2001, About.com	
 Lorenz, Matthias N., ed. (2004). Narrative des Entsetzens: Künstlerische, mediale und intellektuelle Deutungen des 11. Septembers 2001. Würzburg: Könighausen & Neumann, 2004. 137 and 149. 		
 Nuyoricans jubiliant about Supreme Court nominee, San Francisco Chronicle	
 Remembering Gregory Corso, The Hudson Reporter	
 Yari Yari Pamberi Black Women Writers Dissecting Globalization, Educational Media Reviews

References

1959 births
Living people
Writers from Atlantic City, New Jersey
American people of Puerto Rican descent
American women poets
Binghamton University alumni
New York University alumni
Puerto Rican poets
Puerto Rican women writers
Rutgers University alumni
American Book Award winners